David Iornos is a Nicaraguan former cyclist. He competed in the individual road race and team time trial events at the 1976 Summer Olympics.

References

External links
 

Year of birth missing (living people)
Living people
Nicaraguan male cyclists
Olympic cyclists of Nicaragua
Cyclists at the 1976 Summer Olympics
Place of birth missing (living people)